Balsi Purbapara is a village in the Patrasayer CD block in the Bishnupur subdivision of the Bankura district in the state of West Bengal, India.

Geography

Location

Note: The map alongside presents some of the notable locations in the subdivision. All places marked in the map are linked in the larger full screen map.

Demographics
According to the 2011 Census of India, Balsi Purbapara had a total population of 1,516, of which 1767 (51%) were males and 749 (49%) were females. There were 155 persons in the age range of 0–6 years. The total number of literate persons in Balsi Purbapara was 1,002 (73.62% of the population over 6 years).

Education
Balsi High School is a Bengali-medium coeducational institution established in 1945. It has facilities for teaching from class V to class XII. The school has 5 computers, a library with 2,000 books and a playground.

Patrasayer Mahavidyalaya was established in 2005 at Patrasayer

Culture
David J. McCutchion mentions the Vishnu temple as a good example of 19th century terracotta decorated standard ‘Birbhum-Bardhaman’ type Bengal deul. He also mentions a Lakshmi Narayana temple with a low towered at-chala built of laterite with stucco work in 1652, another low towered at-chala, a pancharatna dolamancha and an ek-ratna rasmancha.

Balsi Purbapara picture gallery

Healthcare
There is a primary health centre at Balsi, with 10 beds.

References

External links

Villages in Bankura district